Energy in Moldova describes energy and electricity production, consumption and import in Moldova.

Moldova lacks domestic sources of fossil energy and must import substantial amounts of petroleum, coal, natural gas, and other energy resources. Primary energy supply in 2018 was about half natural gas, a quarter oil and solid biomass one-fifth.

Renewable energy is used in the country, primarily for electricity generation or heating. The projected share of renewable energy in the gross final consumption of energy in 2020 is 20%.

Overview
Moldova imports all of its supplies of petroleum, coal, and natural gas, largely from Russia.

Moldova was an observer to the treaty establishing the Energy Community from the outset (2006). Following its interest in full membership, the European Commission was mandated to carry out accession negotiations with Moldova in 2007. In December 2009, the Energy Community Ministerial Council decided on the accession, but made it conditional to amendment of Moldova's gas law. Moldova joined the Energy Community as a full-fledged member in March 2010.

Moldova, together with the other contracting parties, has the following tasks and obligations:
 Extension of the acquis communautaire into their national legislation
 Establishment of mechanism for network energy markets operations
 Creation of a single energy market

The Energy Community acquis communautaire consists of roughly 25 legal acts. It includes key EU legal acts in the area of electricity, gas, oil, environment, energy efficiency, renewable energy resources and statistics. The treaty envisages that the main principles of EU competition policy are also applicable. The timeline for transposition and implementation is laid down by the treaty or by a Ministerial Council decision.

Moldova is a partner country of the EU INOGATE energy programme, which has four key topics: enhancing energy security, convergence of member state energy markets on the basis of EU internal energy market principles, supporting sustainable energy development, and attracting investment for energy projects of common and regional interest.

Electricity production in 2021, million kW*h

See also 

 Cuciurgan power station 
 Dubăsari hydroelectric power plant 
 Energy Community
 INOGATE

References